This is a '''list of Oregon State Beavers football players in the NFL Draft.

Key

Selections

References

Oregon State

Oregon State Beavers NFL Draft